Interactive is a German electronic music group, founded in 1990. They are best known for their 1992 single "Who Is Elvis" which reached No. 12 in Germany, and for their 1994 cover version of Alphaville's "Forever Young", which reached No. 7 in Germany, while also making the top 20 in several other countries. Interactive released two studio albums, Intercollection in 1991 and Touché in 1995. Their last released work was the 1998 single "Fanatic". In 2002, Kosmonova remixed their version of "Forever Young".

Discography

Albums

Singles

References

External links
 Interactive at Myspace

German electronic music groups
Musical groups established in 1990
English-language singers from Germany